Laugh to Laugh: Ang Kulit! is a Philippine television gag show broadcast by QTV. Hosted by Ryan Yllana, Boy 2 Quizon, Jaja Gonzales, Boom Boom Gonzales and Julia Clarete, it premiered on November 11, 2005. The show concluded on April 28, 2006.

Segments
 Lower Labasan (Likod ng Upper Looban Sa Corner ng Kantuhan)
 Laugh to Laugh Challenge
 Laugh to Laugh Acting Contest
 Totong Galit
 Arai Ku

2005 Philippine television series debuts
2006 Philippine television series endings
Filipino-language television shows
Philippine comedy television series
Q (TV network) original programming